"Rock 'n' Roll Angel" is a song recorded by American country music group The Kentucky Headhunters.  It was released in October 1990 as the fourth single from the album Pickin' on Nashville.  They reached #23 on the Billboard Hot Country Singles & Tracks chart.  The song was written by Headhunters' guitarist Richard Young.

Chart performance

References

1990 singles
1990 songs
The Kentucky Headhunters songs
Mercury Records singles